Sir Hugh Cholmondeley Thornton  (16 May 1881 – 8 March 1962) was a British civil servant.

Thornton was the son of a clergyman and was educated at Kelly College, Tavistock, Devon, and Christ Church, Oxford. He worked for Conservative Central Office from 1907 to 1914, when he was commissioned into the Middlesex Regiment. In 1915, as a Lieutenant, he transferred to the Duke of Cornwall's Light Infantry, being promoted Captain and Major later the same year. In December 1916 he was appointed private secretary to Lord Milner in the War Cabinet, and accompanied him when he was appointed successively Secretary of State for War and Secretary of State for the Colonies.<ref>Wrench, Alfred Lord Milner, pg. 319</ref>

In 1920, Thornton was appointed Second Crown Agent for the Colonies. He served as a Crown Agent until his retirement in 1943, ending his career as Senior Crown Agent. He was appointed both Companion of the Order of St Michael and St George (CMG) and Commander of the Royal Victorian Order (CVO) in the 1920 New Year Honours, and Knight Commander of the Order of St Michael and St George (KCMG) in 1943.

Footnotes

Sources
 Wrench, John Evelyn, Alfred Lord Milner: The Man of No Illusions, London: Eyre & Spottiswoode, 1958

References
Obituary, The Times'', 9 March 1962

1881 births
1962 deaths
People educated at Kelly College
Alumni of Christ Church, Oxford
Middlesex Regiment officers
Duke of Cornwall's Light Infantry officers
British Army personnel of World War I
Private secretaries in the British Civil Service
Civil servants in the Cabinet Office
Civil servants in the War Office
Civil servants in the Colonial Office
British Crown Agents
Knights Commander of the Order of St Michael and St George
Commanders of the Royal Victorian Order